Charles Darnay, Charles D'Aulnais or Charles St. Evrémonde is a fictional character in the 1859 novel A Tale of Two Cities by Charles Dickens.

Overview
Darnay is a wealthy gentleman who spends time in both France and England during the time of the story. However, he resents how the lower classes are extorted and kept in extreme poverty by the upper class. Darnay specifically resents the views of his uncle, Marquis St. Evrémonde, who has no respect for the people in poverty. He abandons his own family name in favor of his mother's, D'Aulnais, which he later alters to "Darnay"; relocating to London, he finds work as a tutor of French language and literature.

Darnay is put on trial for treason against the Kingdom of Great Britain, but the key eyewitness testimony against him is undermined when his defense counsel directs attention to Sydney Carton, a barrister who has been assisting in the case. The two men bear a strong resemblance to one another, and Darnay is acquitted as a result. Later, Darnay succeeds his uncle as Marquis when the latter is stabbed to death in his sleep by a French revolutionary. Both Darnay and Carton express their love for Lucie Manette, but Darnay courts and marries her.

As the French Revolution begins, Darnay is arrested and brought before a tribunal, where the crimes of his uncle and father are brought to light. He is sentenced to death by guillotine, and bravely accepts his fate. However, Carton then takes his place (rendering Darnay unconscious so that he cannot refuse his help) so that he and his family can escape.

Later, Lucie and Charles have a son whom they call Sydney in honour of their friend.

Cinematic and theatrical portrayals
In the 1935 Metro-Goldwyn-Mayer film adaptation, Charles Darnay is portrayed by Donald Woods.

In the 1958 The Rank Organisation film adaptation, Charles Darnay is portrayed by Paul Guers.

In the 1989 Masterpiece Theatre television adaptation, Charles Darnay is played by Xavier Deluc.

In the 2008 Broadway musical/play adaptation of A Tale of Two Cities, Charles Darnay is played by Aaron Lazar.

External links
 "Cliffnotes" article on Charles Darnay
 SparkNotes: A Tale of Two Cities: Character List

Literary characters introduced in 1859
A Tale of Two Cities characters
Fictional marquesses and marchionesses
Fictional French people in literature
Characters in British novels
Male characters in film
Male characters in literature
Fictional people sentenced to death